Construct, Constructs or constructs may refer to:

 Construct (information technology), a collection of logic components forming an interactive agent or environment
 Language construct
 Construct (album), a 2013 album by Dark Tranquillity
 Construct (philosophy), a hypothetical object whose phenomenal existence depends upon a subject's mind
 Construct (python library), a software library used for data-structuring
 Construct (software), an HTML5-based game creator

 Construct state, an Afro-Asiatic noun-form

 DNA construct, a segment of nucleic acid, created artificially, for transplantation into a target cell or tissue
 Social construct (disambiguation)
 Construct (psychology), a label used in behavioural sciences for a domain of behaviors

 an alternative name for a concrete category
 biological creations appearing in the Wheel of Time series of fantasy novels

See also
 Construction
 Construx, a brand of plastic building toys